The Mekongga Mountains (Pegunungan Mekongga, Bingkoka Mountains) are a range of mountains on the island of Sulawesi (Celebes), in Indonesia. Running north-west–southeast, on the western side of the southeast peninsula of the island, they are parallel to and west of the Tanggeasinua Range and lie in the province of Southeast Sulawesi.

Notes and references

Mountains of Sulawesi